Quinte West is a city, geographically located in but administratively separated from Hastings County, in Southern Ontario, Canada. It is located on the western end of the Bay of Quinte on Lake Ontario. The Lake Ontario terminus of the Trent–Severn Waterway is located in the municipality.

History
Quinte West was formed on January 1, 1998, through the amalgamation of the city of Trenton, the village of Frankford and the townships of Murray and Sidney. Trenton is the largest community and serves as the administrative and commercial centre.

Communities

In addition to Trenton and Frankford, the district of Quinte West, also includes the communities of Barcovan Beach, Batawa, Bayside, Carrying Place, Chatterton, German's Landing, Glen Miller, Glen Ross, Halloway, Johnstown, Lovett, Madoc Junction, Maple View, Mount Zion, Oak Lake, River Valley, Roseland Acres, Spencers Landing, Stockdale, Tuftsville, Twelve O'Clock Point, Wallbridge and Wooler.

Frankford was first settled by Europeans in the 1820s when settler Abel Scott built a grist mill along the Trent River. The settlement went under a number of names, including Scott's Mills, Cold Creek and Manchester. The settlement was named Frankford after Sir Francis Bond Head, the Lieutenant-Governor of Upper Canada. Frankford was incorporated as a village in 1920.

Economy
Quinte West is an electoral riding, home to 8 Wing Trenton, the Canadian Armed Forces' primary air transportation hub. It is the area's biggest employer. 8 Wing/CFB Trenton is the largest air base in the Royal Canadian Air Force and supports Canadian Armed Forces operations around the world. Airfield services include snow removal, crash response and rescue services, 24-hour air traffic control, and a paved runway of over 10,000 feet which can accommodate a wide range of aircraft.  There is a Canada Border Services Agency (CBSA) office located on site.

In May 2010, Trenton formally welcomed Toronto-based Metro Paper Industries Tissue Group set up a manufacturing facility of converted paper products at Quinte West. Earlier, this facility was operated by Pepsi Quaker Oats which was subsequently shut down.

Trenton is also home to Nestle Canada Inc., Electro Cables Inc., Globalmed Inc., Canadian Blast Freezers, Trenton Cold Storage Group, Deca Cables Inc., Domtech Inc., Drossbach North America, Fracan Ltd., L3 Communications Spar Aerospace Ltd., L3 Communications- CMRO, Norampac Inc., Quality Custom Blending, Research Casting International, SAB Group, Saputo Foods, and Quinn & Quinn Inc., just to name a few.

Demographics

Place of origin
As of 2015, 7% of the population of Quinte West are immigrants, 4.4% of the total population having migrated prior to 1981. 80% of the immigrant population migrated from Asia. Of the whole population, 64.8% of Quinte West residents had not moved homes within 5 years prior to 2015.

Religion

The population of Trenton is largely Christian, although a small Jewish community exists in Quinte West and the surrounding area, with a synagogue operating in neighbouring Belleville.  There is also a small Muslim community, with a mosque in Belleville and a recently opened mosque in Trenton.

Public schools
The Public school system is served by the Hastings & Prince Edward District School Board (HPEDSB), which classifies Bayside Secondary School (Quinte West) and Bayside Public School in Belleville, but they are actually geographically located in Bayside, which is a borough of Quinte West.

Public secondary schools:
 Trenton High School
 Bayside Secondary School (Trenton) French Immersion School
École Secondaire Marc Garneau (CEPE))

Catholic secondary school:
 St. Paul Catholic Secondary School

Public elementary schools:
 Bayside Public School
 Frankford Public School
 Murray Centennial Public School 
 North Trenton Public School
 Prince Charles Public School 
 Trent River Public School
 V.P. Carswell Elementary School
 École élémentaire Cité-Jeunesse (CEPE))

Catholic elementary school:
 St. Mary Catholic School
 St. Peter Catholic School
 Sacred Heart Catholic School

French Catholic elementary school:
 École élémentaire catholique L'ENVOL

Media
Trenton is the official community of licence for one radio station, CJTN-FM, although the station broadcasts from studios in Belleville. The city has its own edition of the regional community newspaper EMC, Osprey Media publishes the community newspaper The Trentonian, and CFB Trenton has its own Canadian Forces newspaper, the Contact.

Emergency services
Hastings-Quinte EMS paramedics operate from a station in Trenton. Quinte West Fire Rescue provides fire and rescue services from seven stations located throughout the municipality. The Trenton fire station is staffed by a combination of full-time and volunteer / paid-on-call firefighters, while the remaining six stations are fully volunteer. Police services are provided by the Ontario Provincial Police under contract. The OPP operates a detachment in Trenton.

References

External links

 
Cities in Ontario
Populated places on Lake Ontario in Canada
Single-tier municipalities in Ontario